Diacronema is a genus of haptophytes.

It includes the species D. vlkianum.

The Diacronema genus also includes the marine alga Diacronema lutheri. D.lutheri is a flagellated mobile microalga. It has two apical flagella of different lengths and a haptonema. 
D.lutheri is capable of producing a large amount of polyunsaturated fatty acids, especially eicosapentaenoic acid (EPA) and docosahexaenoic acid (DHA). This characteristic is therefore widely used to feed bivalve molluscs, crustaceans and fish.

References

Haptophyte genera